Queen Street (Levin) railway station was a station on the North Island Main Trunk in New Zealand, serving Levin.

It was a passenger-only stopping place, opened on 16 July, or 11 June 1956 and closed on 17 December 1977.

History 
The railway through Queen Street was opened by the Wellington and Manawatu Railway Company on Monday 2 August 1886, when trains started to run between Longburn and Ōtaki, though a special train had run from Longburn to Ohau in April 1886. The first through train from Wellington to Palmerston North ran on 30 November 1886.

It cost £744.1.11. New steps were built in 1963 and the platform was tar sealed.

Tenders for removal were sought in 1978 and it went in 1985.

References

Defunct railway stations in New Zealand
Levin, New Zealand
Buildings and structures in Manawatū-Whanganui
Railway stations opened in 1956
Railway stations closed in 1977
Rail transport in Manawatū-Whanganui